The Estadio Tecnológico was a multi-purpose stadium located in Monterrey, Nuevo León, Mexico, located on the campus of the Monterrey Institute of Technology and Higher Education (ITESM). It hosted football and American football games during its 67-year existence, from 1950 to 2017.

Starting 2017, the stadium was demolished. The venue was replaced by the Estadio Borregos, completed in April 2019. The new 10,000 venue stadium is designed to house American Football and Soccer games.

History
Construction of a new stadium to house the Borregos Salvajes American football team began in August 1949. A society raised half a million pesos in 17 days in order to break ground, with Constructora Maiz Mier as the general contractor.

The stadium was formally opened on July 17, 1950 by Mexican President Miguel Alemán Valdés. Originally, it seated 20,000 spectators. In 1965, a new upper deck was added on the west side to bring the stadium's capacity to 33,600; this expansion was celebrated with a match between C.F. Monterrey and FK Vojvodina, champions of Yugoslavia, which the locals won 2–1.

The north end zone's "horseshoe" was added in 1986 to bring the stadium's capacity to 38,000 seats for its use in the 1986 Mexico FIFA World Cup. In the early 1990s, luxury boxes were added which reduced the capacity to its current figure.

In 1991, the first tartan athletics track in Mexico was installed in the Estadio Tecnológico. The original blue track was replaced with a more traditional red color in 2002.

By the mid-2000s, with the Estadio Tecnológico being the second-oldest venue in Liga MX at the time behind Estadio Azul in Mexico City and manager Miguel Herrera declaring it "obsolete", C.F. Monterrey began exploring plans for a new stadium. Administration at FEMSA, which owned the club, said that although they had presented plans to Monterrey Institute of Technology and Higher Education (ITESM) administration to add 8,000 seats by lowering the field and eliminating the athletics track, these had not been approved, and so they began planning for a new stadium at a site known as La Pastora. Additionally, the proposed expansion would have aggravated the already troublesome parking situation in the neighborhood and could have affected the view from the stadium's suites.

In February 2014, it was announced that the stadium would be demolished after its largest tenant, C.F. Monterrey, moved to Estadio BBVA Bancomer in 2015. The stadium is to make way for an urban redevelopment project known as Distrito Tec, which will include new academic buildings for the ITESM, a new sporting complex known as the Centro Deportivo Borrego, and a new American football stadium for the Borregos Salvajes. Demolition, however, was postponed to 2017. In an event in March, the Borregos flag that had flown over the stadium was lowered to be raised again at the dedication of the new Estadio Tecnológico, planned for September 6, 2018 to coincide with the 75th anniversary of the ITESM. As part of the project, an artificial turf field will be laid down for a temporary venue in which the Borregos Salvajes will play the 2017 college football season. 

On April 29, 2017, the Estadio Tecnológico opened to the public once more for a farewell ceremony attended by more than 12,000. Two women's soccer matches on June 10, one between the national teams of Mexico and Venezuela and a friendly between the women's teams of Tigres and Monterrey, were the final events held in the stadium before demolition began on the 29th.

Tenants

C.F. Monterrey

From 1952 to 1973 and again from 1980 to 2015, the Estadio Tecnológico was home to one of Monterrey's most important soccer clubs, Club de Fútbol Monterrey (known as the Rayados). The club began playing its home matches at the Estadio Tecnólogico upon its revival as a Second Division squad in 1952—the first Rayados match saw them lose 3–1 to Veracruz—and remained there until 2015, except for a period between January 1973 and September 1980 when they played at the Estadio Universitario, home to rival club Tigres UANL.

In 1977–78, with preparations for the 1977 CONCACAF Championship underway at the Estadio Universitario, both Tigres and Rayados played at the Estadio Tecnológico, including the first Clásico Regio derby held in the stadium; it would be the first of 42 meetings between the two clubs venue, with the final fixture being a 2–2 draw in October 2014.

Monterrey won league titles in 1986 (Mexico 1986) and Apertura 2010 in the venue, as well as the Copa MX in 1991 and the CONCACAF Champions League in 2012–13.

The final Monterrey soccer fixture in the Estadio Tecnológico was played on May 9, 2015, a 2–2 tie against Pumas. The club began playing at the Estadio BBVA Bancomer in time for the Apertura 2015 tournament.

International soccer
International soccer came to the Estadio Tecnológico on several occasions.

The 1983 FIFA World Youth Championship marked the first FIFA event at the Estadio Tecnológico. The venue hosted five games, including three group stage fixtures, a quarterfinal and a semifinal.

Three matches of the 1986 FIFA World Cup were played at the Estadio Tecnológico, pitting the England national team against Portugal, Morocco and Poland.

Borregos Salvajes
The Estadio Tecnológico was initially built to house the university's American football team, which played in the Estadio Tecnológico through the 2016 season. During that time, the Borregos Salvajes won 22 national titles. On several occasions, they won the title in the Estadio Tecnológico, with the first such championship coming in 1993. The final Borregos Salvajes game in the stadium took place on November 4, 2016, when the Borregos beat the team representing the ITESM Campus México 28–0.

1986 FIFA World Cup

Other events

Estadio Tecnológico also hosted the Fundidores de Monterrey professional American football team of the Liga de Fútbol Americano Profesional in its 2017 season. The club's final game of the regular season, played on April 9, 2017, was the final American football match at the venue. Additionally, track and field events were held in the stadium, such as the Galatlética 2005, which featured Ana Gabriela Guevara and Tonique Williams.

Several concerts also stopped by the Estadio Tecnológico, beginning with a visit by Bon Jovi in February 1990 for two shows on the New Jersey Syndicate Tour. On February 12, 2006, the Irish rock band U2 opened the 4th leg of its Vertigo Tour at the Estadio Tecnológico, to a crowd of 42,000. In 2010, the Black Eyed Peas played the Estadio Tecnológico in what turned out to be the final concert in the stadium.

See also

List of football stadiums in Mexico

References

Monterrey Institute of Technology and Higher Education
Tecnologico
Sports venues in Monterrey
College American football venues in Mexico
Athletics (track and field) venues in Mexico
C.F. Monterrey
1986 FIFA World Cup stadiums
American football venues in Mexico
1950 establishments in Mexico
Sports venues completed in 1950
Sports venues demolished in 2017